This list contains players who have appeared in nationally organised first-team competition for Doncaster Rovers from its creation in 1879 until the end of First World War. Players that also represented the club after the war are included.

Explanation of list

Players should be listed in chronological order according to the season in which they first played for the club, and then by alphabetical order of their surname. Initially, the club only played friendlies, their first cup match being in October 1885. Doncaster joined their first league, the Midland Alliance, in 1890. To varying degrees in subsequent years, friendlies still formed a significant part of the fixtures throughout the season. Further information on competitions/seasons which are regarded as eligible for appearance stats are provided below.

League appearances
League appearances and goals should include data for the following league spells: 
 Midland Alliance: 1890−91
 Midland Football League: 1891−92 to 1900−01; 1903−04; 1905−06 to 1915
 Football League: 1901−02 to 1902−03; 1904−05
 Midland Combination: 1915−16

Total appearances
The figures for total appearances and goals should include the League figures together with the following competitions:
 FA Cup
 Sheffield and Hallamshire FA Minor Challenge Cup
 Sheffield and Hallamshire FA Senior Challenge Cup
 Gainsborough News Charity Cup
 Wharncliffe Charity Cup
 Wharncliffe Charity League
 Mexborough Montague Charity Cup
 The Yorkshire League
 Friendlies (pre 1890−91 when Doncaster weren't in a league)

History

First match as Doncaster Rovers
The first match was in September 1879 when Albert Jenkins got together a group of young men to play against The Yorkshire Institute for the Deaf and Dumb in which they drew 4−4 after being behind 4−0 at half time. It was after this match that the group of players decided to play further games and call themselves Doncaster Rovers on the walk back into the town. The first match played under this name was a 0−0 draw on 3 October 1879 at Rawmarsh F.C.. The line up in a 2−2−6 formation was:
Goalkeeper: William Walker
Right back: Albert Jenkins
Left back: John Mitchell
Right half back: Thomas Clark
Left half back: William H. Salmon
Outside right: William Chadwick
Inside right: William Bedford
Centre forward: Arthur Roper
Centre forward: John Boyle Gosling
Inside left: William Simpson
Outside left: William Titterington

First Football League match
After already playing their first game of the 1901–02 season in the Midland League on 2 September, Doncaster were voted into the Football League following New Brighton Tower folding as a club. Continuing with the squad they already had, the first match was against Burslem Port Vale on Saturday 7 September 1901. The crowd at the Intake Ground was 2,000. It was 0–0 at half time, then Len Goodson scored two for Rovers. The Vale then scored 3 goals, with Frank Bailey getting the equaliser making the final score 3–3. The line up was a 2–3–5 formation of:
Goalkeeper: Jack Eggett
Full back: George Simpson
Full back: Walter Langton
Half back: Billy Longden
Half back: Arthur Jones
Half back: Ellis Wright
Forward: Billy Langham
Forward: John Murphy
Forward: Jack Price
Forward: Len Goodson
Forward: Frank Bailey

Players

Notes

References 
General
 
 

Specific

 
Doncaster Rovers
Association football player non-biographical articles